John Edward Marsden (born 9 December 1992) is an English footballer. He has previously played in the Football League for Shrewsbury Town, and had a nomadic career in non-league football.

Career
Marsden played youth team football with Wrexham and Wigan Athletic, and was a prolific goal scorer for Liverpool Schoolboys at under-14 and under-15 levels. He joined Scottish club Celtic at the age of 16, signing a professional contract. He spent the 2010–11 season on loan to Hamilton Academical's youth team. Whilst at Celtic, Marsden suffered a broken foot, all but ending his chances of breaking into the first team, and was subsequently released. He moved on to Rochdale, playing on non-contract terms for their reserve side and scoring eight in 14 games. After a contract failed to materialise, however, he joined Welsh Premier League side Aberystwyth Town and then Stockport Sports.

After scoring 21 goals in 31 matches for Stockport Sports he earned a trial at Stoke City. His trial was successful and he signed a contract until the end of the 2012–13 season. Marsden failed to extend his stay at Stoke and joined Shrewsbury Town in July 2013 after a trial period. He made his professional debut in a goalless draw against Milton Keynes Dons on 3 August 2013, and appeared again in a League Cup defeat to Bolton Wanderers, but broke a bone in his foot early in the game, an injury which ruled him out for up to eight weeks. On 24 January 2014, Shrewsbury Town confirmed the departure of Marsden by mutual consent.

On 4 August 2014 Marsden joined Conference Premier side Southport. He moved on loan to Lincoln City for the rest of the season on 12 February 2015. He then had a short spell at Macclesfield Town, making two appearances in August 2015 before joining Welsh side Colwyn Bay.

Marsden joined Stockport County in January 2016.

In July 2018 he joined Stalybridge Celtic. He left the club in September 2018.

Career statistics

References

External links
 
 

Living people
English footballers
Association football forwards
English Football League players
Wrexham A.F.C. players
Celtic F.C. players
Hamilton Academical F.C. players
Rochdale A.F.C. players
Aberystwyth Town F.C. players
Stockport Sports F.C. players
Stoke City F.C. players
Shrewsbury Town F.C. players
Southport F.C. players
Macclesfield Town F.C. players
1992 births
Stockport County F.C. players
Colwyn Bay F.C. players
Telford United F.C. players
Stalybridge Celtic F.C. players